The 1968 Texas A&M Aggies football team represented Texas A&M University in the 1968 NCAA University Division football season as a member of the Southwest Conference (SWC). The Aggies were led by head coach Gene Stallings in his fourth season and finished with a record of three wins and seven losses (3–7 overall, 2–5 in the SWC).

Schedule

Roster

References

Texas AandM
Texas A&M Aggies football seasons
Texas AandM Aggies football